Änniksaare is a village in Mustvee Parish, Jõgeva County in northeastern Estonia. In 2010 it had a population of 25.

References

 

Villages in Jõgeva County